"Une femme avec une femme" (Spanish: "Mujer contra mujer") is a 1990 song by Spanish pop band Mecano. In the late 1990, it was released as a single from the band's seventh album, released in 1988, Descanso dominical, on which it appears as the third track. It became a hit in France, hitting number one for seven weeks. Also in 1990, the song was notably covered by the pop duo formed by Argentine singers Sandra Mihanovich and Celeste Carballo as the title track of their studio album Mujer contra mujer, which is regarded as a landmark by the country's lesbian community.

In 2003, the song was also covered by Saya, becoming a top ten hit in France.

Background
To obtain a hit in France, Mecano decided to collaborate with Pierre Grosz, a lyric writer, who had already written several songs for Elsa ("Quelque chose dans mon cœur", "Jour de neige"). Grosz accurately translated their song "Mujer contra mujer" to produce the French single "Une femme avec une femme". The music is composed by José Maria Cano. It was recorded in French ("Une femme avec une femme") and Italian ("Per Lei contro di Lei"), giving Mecano their first truly global hit.

Lyrics and video
This song deals with lesbianism, seen through the eyes of a friend, who doesn't want to pass judgment on this relationship and prefers to be tolerant. At the time, the subject was taboo in France and had almost never been tackled in a song.

The videoclip is largely in black and white and features Ana Torroja singing in front of a white fence. There are also two women in love who arm wrestle, which represents their different point of view regarding whether or not to hide their homosexuality – one of them says hiding it is not good, the other says there is no choice.

Chart performance
"Une femme avec une femme" entered the French Top 50 Singles Chart at number 34 in the chart edition of 9 September 1990, climbed quickly and peaked at number one for seven weeks, from its eighth to its 14th week. Then it was dislodged by François Feldman's "Petit Frank" and stayed at number two for three weeks, then it kept on dropping in the chart and left off the top 50 after 22 weeks of presence. After a prestigious Iberian career, Mecano thus became the first Spanish group to reach first place in France's Singles Chart. The song was certified Gold disc in 1991 by the French certifier Syndicat National de l'Édition Phonographique, for a minimum of 250,000 copies sold. 

On the Eurochart Hot 100, it debuted at number 100 on 6 October 1990, climbed every week until peaking at number eight in its eighth week. It totalled five weeks in the top ten and 20 weeks in the top 100.

Track listings
 7" single Ariola
 "Une femme avec une femme" - 4:05
 "Mujer contra mujer" - 4:05

 CD maxi
 "Une femme avec une femme" - 4:05
 "Mujer contra mujer" - 4:05
 "Hijo de la luna" - 4:18

Charts and sales

Weekly charts

Year-end charts

Certifications

Sandra Mihanovich and Celeste Carballo version

Argentine singers Sandra Mihanovich and Celeste Carballo notably covered the song and included it as the title track of their second and final studio album as a pop duo, Mujer contra mujer, released in October 1990 by RCA Records. The choice of title, cover art and songs were centered on the message of lesbian love, considered a bold and unprecedented act in Argentine popular culture. Mujer contra mujer is widely remembered for a promotional campaign in which the city of Buenos Aires was wallpapered with large posters featuring its controversial cover photograph, which shows both singers in a naked embrace.

The song was produced by Argentine rock musician Fito Páez, who also played the piano, keyboard, bass and electronic drums. It is the opening track of the album's B-side. When promoting the record, Mihanovich and Carballo gave a famous performance of "Mujer contra mujer" at Susana Giménez' talk show, where they got very close to each other to share a microphone after one of them suddenly stopped working. The duo also appeared at Imagen de Radio, a TV program hosted by Juan Alberto Badía, where Carballo famously came out in a landmark moment for Argentine lesbians.

Today, the release of Mujer contra mujer is celebrated as a turning point in the visibility of lesbians within Argentine society, and a symbol for the local LGBT community. Writing for Página/12 in 2009, lesbian feminist journalist Marta Dillon reflected: "[Mujer contra mujer was] an outburst typical of convulsive years, of the end of a decade, that of the '80s, which called for, at least, attitude. And anyone who was a teenager then knows that the attitude those girls had was more challenging than any other taken by fleeting rock stars. How can we describe what that kick to the closet meant without appealing to our own memory? Also for those who didn't even dream that being a lesbian was possible, for those who fantasized, for those who fantasized but made an effort to have a boyfriend, for the gays from the provinces, for those from the city, for those who were alone, for those who couldn't read between the lines in Virus' lyrics or Freddie Mercury's drag attitude."

Saya version

In 2003, "Une femme avec une femme" was covered by French-born artist Saya who peaked at number nine on the French SNEP Singles Chart on March 29 and April 5, 2003 and remained on the chart for 17 weeks. It peaked at number 35 on the Swiss Singles Chart. The song is the second track on her album À la Vie, released in 2003. On June 6, 2003, the song was certified Silver disc (meaning over 100,000 copies were sold) four months after its release by SNEP, becoming Saya's greatest hit.

Track listings
 CD single
 "Une femme avec une femme" - 3:40
 "Ils croyaient" - 3:31

Charts and sales

Other cover versions
American singer Laura Branigan covered the Spanish version ("Mujer Contra Mujer") in 1993 for her final studio album, Over My Heart.

On August 19, 2010, American duo Ha*Ash participated in the album tribute for Mecano entitled, Tributo a Ana, José y Nacho, recording a new Spanish version of "Mujer Contra Mujer".

References

1990 singles
1991 singles
Lesbian-related songs
Mecano songs
SNEP Top Singles number-one singles
1988 songs
Warner Music Group singles